Old Glory is an unincorporated community in Blount County, in the U.S. state of Tennessee.

History
A gas station owner who painted his building the colors of Old Glory caused the surrounding community's name to be adopted.

References

Unincorporated communities in Blount County, Tennessee
Unincorporated communities in Tennessee